Howard T. McCarty (April 15, 1919 – 1973) was an American professional basketball player. He played in the National Basketball League for the Cleveland Allmen Transfers and Detroit Falcons, as well as in the Basketball Association of America for the Detroit Gems.

BAA career statistics

Regular season

References

External links
 

1919 births
1973 deaths
American men's basketball players
Basketball players from Detroit
Cleveland Allmen Transfers players
Detroit Falcons (basketball) players
Detroit Gems players
Forwards (basketball)
Guards (basketball)
Wayne State Warriors men's basketball players